Tucales is a genus of longhorn beetles of the subfamily Lamiinae.

 Tucales franciscus (Thomson, 1857)
 Tucales pastranai (Prosen, 1954)
 Tucales terrenus (Pascoe, 1859)

References

Compsosomatini